Ivan Čović (born 17 September 1990 in Zagreb, Croatia) is a Croatian footballer who plays as a goalkeeper for Slaven Belupo.

Club career

Inter Zaprešić
On July 1, 2009, Čović signed his first professional contract with Inter Zaprešić.

NK Hrvatski Dragovoljac
On July 2, 2010, Čović signed for NK Hrvatski Dragovoljac as a free agent. He played for the team from 2010 to 2014 having 101 apps.

Return to Inter Zaprešić
On September 1, 2014, Čović returned to his former club NK Inter Zaprešić for an undisclosed fee.

Apollon Smyrnis
In June 2017, Čović switched clubs and countries and signed for Apollon Smyrnis.

Sepsi OSK Sfântu Gheorghe and HNK Gorica
Čović joined Sepsi OSK on 28 June 2018. He played there until 13 February 2019, where he joined HNK Gorica.

References

External links
 

1990 births
Living people
Footballers from Zagreb
Association football goalkeepers
Croatian footballers
NK Inter Zaprešić players
NK Hrvatski Dragovoljac players
Apollon Smyrnis F.C. players
Sepsi OSK Sfântu Gheorghe players
HNK Gorica players
NK Slaven Belupo players
Croatian Football League players
First Football League (Croatia) players
Super League Greece players
Croatian expatriate footballers
Expatriate footballers in Greece
Croatian expatriate sportspeople in Greece